Renate Mannhardt (1920–2013) was a German actress. She starred in Peter Lorre's 1951 film The Lost One.

Filmography

References

External links

Bibliography 
 

1920 births
2013 deaths
German film actresses
20th-century German actresses